An-My Lê  (born 1960) is a Vietnamese American photographer, and professor at Bard College.

She is a 2012 MacArthur Foundation Fellow and has received the John Simon Guggenheim Memorial Foundation Fellowship (1997), the National Science Foundation Antarctic Artists and Writers Program Award (2007), and the Tiffany Comfort Foundation Fellowship (2010). Her work was included in the 2017 Whitney Biennial.

Biography 
An-My Lê was born in Saigon, Vietnam, in 1960. She left Vietnam in 1975. She studied biology at Stanford University, receiving her BA in 1981 and her MA in 1985. She attended  Yale School of Art, receiving her MFA in 1993.

Her book Small Wars was published in 2005. In November 2014, her second book, Events Ashore, was published by Aperture. Events Ashore depicts a 9-year exploration of the US Navy working throughout the world. The project began when the artist was invited to photograph US naval ships preparing for deployment to Iraq, the first in a series of visits to battleships, humanitarian missions in Africa and Asia, training exercises, and scientific missions in the Arctic and Antarctic.

Awards and grants 
1993: 	Blair Dickinson Memorial Award, Yale University School of Art
1995: 	CameraWorks Inc. fellowship
1996: 	New York Foundation for the Arts fellowship in photography
1997: 	John Simon Guggenheim Memorial Foundation fellowship
2004: 	John Gutmann Photography Fellowship
2007: 	National Science Foundation, Antarctic Artists and Writers Program Award
2010:	Tiffany Comfort Foundation
2012:	John D. and Catherina T. MacArthur Foundation Fellowship

Books 
Small Wars. New York: Aperture, 2005. Essay by Richard B. Woodward. Interview by Hilton Als.
Events Ashore. New York: Aperture, 2014. Essay by Geoff Dyer.

Other works 
 Viêt Nam (1994–98)
 Small Wars (1999–2002) – An album of photos she took between 1999 and 2002 during a reenactment of the Vietnam War. The photos were primarily taken in black and white and portray different scenes that portray battles from the Vietnam War.
 29 Palms (2003–04)
 Trap Rock (2006)

Exhibitions
2017 Whitney Biennial

References

External links

An-My Lê's Website: Official site
Thislongcentury.com
Blog.art21.org
Disart.org

1960 births
Living people
MacArthur Fellows
Bard College faculty
Stanford University alumni
Yale School of Art alumni
People from Ho Chi Minh City
Vietnamese emigrants to the United States
20th-century American photographers
21st-century American photographers
20th-century American women photographers
21st-century American women photographers
American women academics